Zuo Dabin (born 22 October 1943), also known by her art name Honghui, is a Chinese actress and educator best known for her role as Guanyin in Journey to the West.

She was a member of the 7th and 8th National Committee of the Chinese People's Political Consultative Conference. She is vice president of Hunan Federation of literary and Art Circles and Hunan Drama Association.

Early life and education
Zuo was born on October 22, 1943 in Xingyang, Henan, to Zuo Zonglian, a major general under the leadership of Cheng Qian in the KMT troops and magistrate of Ru County (1940–1943) and Xingyang County (1943–1945), and Zheng Fuqiu, a Xiang opera performer. She has an elder sister. Her ancestral home is in Changsha, Hunan. After graduation, she was assigned to Hunan Opera Theatre as an actress.

Acting career
In 1959, when Mao Zedong returned to Hunan, she performed For Life or for Death. After the performance, Mao Zedong invited her to dance.

In 1966, the Cultural Revolution broke out, she was denounced as a "shoots of revisionism" because her father once served in the KMT army. She was sent to the Dao County to do farm works for two years.

In 1973, she made her film debut in Song of Teacher, playing Yu Ying. Jiang Qing criticizes her "acting like a young mistress of the house! The film is a poisonous grass!" On August 4 of that same year, she made a review at the Beijing Exhibition Hall. After watching the film, Mao Zedong said: "What is the 'big poisonous grass'?  What's wrong with it?" Mao Zedong's speech lessened her criticism.

In 1976, at the age of 33, she acted as Guanyin in The Legend of Chasing Fish. After watching the opera, director Yang Jie felt very satisfied. In 1982, Yang Jie invited her to portray Guanyin in Journey to the West, adapted from Ming dynasty novelist Wu Cheng'en's classical novel of the same title. The series was one of the most watched ones in mainland China in that year.

She joined the Communist Party of China in 1984.

Since 2003, she taught at Hunan Vocational College of Art and Hunan Opera Theatre.

Filmography

Film

Television

Xiang opera

Variety show

Awards

References

1943 births
Living people
People from Changsha
20th-century Chinese actresses
21st-century Chinese actresses
Chinese television actresses
Chinese film actresses
Chinese child actresses
Actresses from Henan
Actresses from Hunan
Singers from Henan
Singers from Hunan
20th-century Chinese women singers
Chinese opera actresses